Setanta Sports Eurasia is a sports television network operating in the Baltic States, Eastern Europe and Central Asia operated and owned by Adjarasport trading as Setanta Sports.

Availability

Setanta Sports Eurasia is currently available in Armenia, Azerbaijan, Belarus, Estonia, Georgia, Kazakhstan, Kyrgyzstan, Latvia, Lithuania, Moldova, Tajikistan, Turkmenistan, Ukraine and Uzbekistan.

History
The channel launched in 2012 and is available in English, Georgian, Latvian, Ukrainian and Russian. From 2012 to 2021 was owned by Eurasian Broadcasting Enterprise Ltd (EBEL). In February 2021 it was acquired by Georgian sports TV company Adjarasport who advised they would continue with the Setanta brand.

On August 28, 2021 streaming service Setanta Sports was launched.

Channels
Setanta Sports 1 (launched in 2012)
Setanta Sports 2 (launched in 2014)
Setanta Qazaqstan (launched in 2016)
Setanta Georgia (launched in 2016)
Setanta Georgia 2 (launched in 2016)
Setanta Georgia 3 (launched in 2022)
Setanta Ukraine (launched on 1 August 2019)
Setanta+ Ukraine (launched in 2020)

Broadcasting rights

References

External links 
 
 

Sports television networks
Rugby union on television
Television channels and stations established in 2012